Graciano Atienza Fernández ( 18 December 1884 – 3 November 1935) was a Spanish journalist, lawyer and politician.

National Journalism Award Graciano Atienza
In 1959, his widow, Mrs. Mary Gullón, instituted in his memory the National Journalism Award Graciano Atienza.

1884 births
1935 deaths
People from the Province of Albacete
20th-century Spanish lawyers
20th-century Spanish politicians
20th-century Spanish journalists